RNIB Connect Radio (previously Insight Radio) is a British radio station that is part of Royal National Institute of Blind People and was Europe's first radio station for blind and partially sighted listeners. It broadcasts 24 hours a day, 7 days a week online, on 101 FM in the Glasgow area, and on Freeview channel 730. Live shows make up around half of the station's output, with the overnight schedule being used as a showcase for the best music, features, interviews and articles from the past few days. Most of the presenters are blind or visually impaired. From 2007 until early 2016 it was known as Insight Radio.

Although the station's main studios are based in Scotland, the station is for everyone in the UK and beyond, with many listeners in the United States and Canada. Other studios are in Edinburgh, Cardiff and London and more locations across the UK are planned for the very near future.

Awards 

In 2007, the Insight Show (which later became the Daily Lunch) won the Silver Sony Award for the Internet Programme Award

The Insight Show
Producers: Nina Kirk, Barry Snell & Michael Hughes
Writers: Jill Daley, Nina Kirk & Robert Kirkwood
Editors: Jill Daley, Michael Hughes, Robert Kirkwood, Allan Russell & Nina Kirk
Presenter: Jill Daley
Performers: Allan Russell, Robert Kirkwood & Laura Steel
"This podcast for blind listeners provides a niche service which would never be accommodated on a mainstream radio station and contains some of the most moving and well-produced human interest content the judges had heard in a long time."

VIPonAIR & RNIB for VIPonAIR.com

Big Brother 

In 2008, a former member of staff from Insight Radio, Michael Hughes, became a contestant on the TV show Big Brother.

History 

The radio station started as an online service called VIP on Air in November 2003, broadcasting for 2 hours a day, and later extending this to a 4-hour broadcast day. In 2007 the service was completely re-vamped, renamed and re-launched as Insight Radio.

The name VIP on Air was changed for a number of reasons. VIP in this context stands for Visually Impaired People but could be easily misunderstood. Also, as the station only broadcast online at the time, it wasn't actually 'on air' at all.

After broadcasting as Insight Radio for a number of years, the station changed its name to RNIB Connect Radio in 2016.

See also
In Touch – a programme on BBC Radio 4 for people who are blind or partially sighted.
RPH Australia – a network of similar radio services in Australia
ACB Radio – a similar American service
 Radio Reading Service – a similar NZ service

References

External links 
 Insight Radio website

Radio reading services
Radio stations in Glasgow
Disability mass media